Champaign Township is a township in Champaign County, Illinois, USA.  As of the 2020 census, its population was 11,264 and it contained 5,091 housing units.

History
Champaign Township changed its name from West Urbana Township on April 30, 1860.

Geography
Champaign is Township 19 North, Range 8 East of the Third Principal Meridian.

The streams of Copper Slough and Phinney Branch run through this township.

Portions of the township have been removed through annexation with the City of Champaign.

Cities and towns
 Savoy (west three-quarters)

Unincorporated towns
 Staley
(This list is based on USGS data and may include former settlements).

Grain elevators
Champaign elevators were operated by C.A. Dickey, Champaign Cereal Mills and Elevator in 1913; also Dryer and Burt Grain and Coal in 1913.

Savoy elevator (Section 36) was built along the Illinois Central—Canadian National railroad. Savoy Grain and Coal Company operated a wooden elevator, no longer standing, in 1913. Concrete silos of the present elevator are east of U.S. Route 45.

Staley's Station elevator (Section 16) was built along the Illinois Central—Canadian National east–west line. It was operating in 1913, but both the station and elevator are gone.

West Urbana Depot, later Champaign (Section 12). Mark Carley built a steam flouring mill, steam grain elevator and warehouse near the Illinois Central—Canadian National railroad in the mid–1850s.

Major highways
  Interstate 57
  Interstate 72
  Interstate 74
  U.S. Route 45
  U.S. Route 150
  Illinois State Route 10

Airports and landing strips
 University of Illinois Heliport

Demographics
As of the 2020 census there were 11,264 people, 4,956 households, and 2,782 families residing in the township. The racial makeup of the township was 69.72% White, 7.60% African American, 0.14% Native American, 14.49% Asian, 0.01% Pacific Islander, 1.21% from other races, and 6.84% from two or more races. Hispanic or Latino of any race were 4.00% of the population.

There were 4,956 households, out of which 26.50% had children under the age of 18 living with them, 50.28% were married couples living together, 4.30% had a female householder with no spouse present, and 43.87% were non-families. 34.20% of all households were made up of individuals, and 16.50% had someone living alone who was 65 years of age or older. The average household size was 2.29 and the average family size was 2.98.

The township's age distribution consisted of 20.5% under the age of 18, 6.5% from 18 to 24, 25.3% from 25 to 44, 23.3% from 45 to 64, and 24.4% who were 65 years of age or older. The median age was 43.0 years. For every 100 females, there were 83.6 males. For every 100 females age 18 and over, there were 83.7 males.

The median income for a household in the township was $80,313, and the median income for a family was $120,417. Males had a median income of $59,375 versus $46,437 for females. The per capita income for the township was $45,675. About 3.5% of families and 8.5% of the population were below the poverty line, including 7.3% of those under age 18 and 8.4% of those age 65 or over.

Economy 

In addition to the University of Illinois, Champaign Township is also home to a Kraft Foods plant (and adjacent AC Humko plant).  The township's major employers include The University of Illinois, Champaign Unit #4 School District, and Kraft Foods.  Numerous township residents are also employed by Parkland College, Kirby Foods, Christie Clinic, Devonshire Group LLC, Amdocs, Hobbico and Horizon Hobby, all of which are in the adjacent city of Champaign, Illinois, as well as by Carle Clinic Association and Provena Health, located in nearby Urbana, Illinois.

References
 
 United States Census Bureau cartographic boundary files

External links
 US-Counties.com
 City-Data.com
 Illinois State Archives

Townships in Champaign County, Illinois
Townships in Illinois
1859 establishments in Illinois
Populated places established in 1859